The 1954 World Table Tennis Championships were held in Wembley from April 5 to April 14, 1954.

Medalists

Team

Individual

References

External links
ITTF Museum

 
World Table Tennis Championships
World Table Tennis Championships
World Table Tennis Championships
Table tennis competitions in the United Kingdom
International sports competitions in London
World Table Tennis Championships
World Table Tennis Championships